Ivan Petrovich Bogdanov (17 August 1855 – 25 December 1932) was a Russian painter.

Biography
Ivan Petrovich Bogdanov was born in Moscow in 1855. His father was a tailor.

From 1878 to 1889 he studied at the Moscow School of Painting, Sculpture and Architecture.

The artist died in Moscow in 1932.

Gallery

References

19th-century painters from the Russian Empire
20th-century Russian painters
Artists from Moscow
1855 births
1932 deaths
Peredvizhniki
Moscow School of Painting, Sculpture and Architecture alumni